The 1979 Prix de l'Arc de Triomphe was a horse race held at Longchamp on Sunday 7 October 1979. It was the 58th running of the Prix de l'Arc de Triomphe.

The winner was Three Troikas, a three-year-old filly trained in France by Criquette Head and ridden by her brother Freddy. The filly won by three lengths from Le Marmot with the odds-on favourite Troy in third. The winning time was 2:28.9.

Race details
 Sponsor: none
 Purse: 
 Going: Dead
 Distance: 2,400 metres
 Number of runners: 22
 Winner's time: 2:28.9

Full result

* Abbreviations: ns = nose; shd = short-head; hd = head; snk = short neck; nk = neck

Winner's details
Further details of the winner, Three Troikas.
 Sex: Filly
 Foaled: 25 January 1976
 Country: France
 Sire: Lyphard; Dam: Three Roses (Dual)
 Owner: Ghislaine Head
 Breeder: Artur Pfaff

References

Prix de l'Arc de Triomphe
 1979
Prix de l'Arc de Triomphe
Prix de l'Arc de Triomphe
Prix de l'Arc de Triomphe